Dairyland is a town in Douglas County, Wisconsin, United States. The population was 186 at the 2000 census. The unincorporated communities of Cozy Corner, Dairyland, and Moose Junction are located in the town.

Transportation
Wisconsin Highway 35 and County Road T are two of the main routes in the community.

Geography
According to the United States Census Bureau, the town has a total area of 140.8 square miles (364.7 km2), of which 140.2 square miles (363.1 km2) is land and 0.6 square miles (1.6 km2) (0.43%) is water.

Dairyland is located 25 miles southwest of Solon Springs, 36 miles south of the city of Superior and 20 miles northeast of Danbury.

Demographics
At the 2000 census, there were 186 people, 87 households and 56 families residing in the town. The population density was 1.3 per square mile (0.5/km2). There were 139 housing units at an average density of 1.0 per square mile (0.4/km2). The racial makeup of the town was 97.31% White, 0.54% Native American, and 2.15% from two or more races.

There were 87 households, of which 13.8% had children under the age of 18 living with them, 54.0% were married couples living together, 6.9% had a female householder with no husband present, and 35.6% were non-families. 31.0% of all households were made up of individuals, and 12.6% had someone living alone who was 65 years of age or older. The average household size was 2.14 and the average family size was 2.59.

13.4% of the population were under the age of 18, 4.3% from 18 to 24, 22.6% from 25 to 44, 40.9% from 45 to 64, and 18.8% who were 65 years of age or older. The median age was 48 years. For every 100 females, there were 116.3 males. For every 100 females age 18 and over, there were 120.5 males.

The median household income was $35,313 and the median income for a family was $48,333. Males had a median income of $27,917 and females $22,083. The per capita income was $18,155. About 7.6% of families and 9.0% of the population were below the poverty line, including none of those under the age of eighteen and 14.3% of those 65 or over.

Notable people
Roy L. Pinn, Wisconsin State Representative

References

Towns in Douglas County, Wisconsin
Towns in Wisconsin